Dora Mavor Moore,  (April 8, 1888 – May 15, 1979) was a Canadian actress, teacher and director who was a pioneer of Canadian theatre.

Life and work
Born Dora Mavor in Glasgow, Scotland, she moved with her family to Toronto, Ontario, Canada in 1894, when her father, James Mavor (1854-1925), became a professor of political economy at the University of Toronto. She was the first Canadian student ever to be accepted at London's Royal Academy of Dramatic Art and graduated in 1912.

In 1915, she married Francis Moore, an Army chaplain. The couple separated in 1928. They had three sons: Francis Wilfrid Mavor, James Mavor Moore, and Peter Mavor.

In 1938, she helped found an amateur theater group called the Village Players which performed Shakespeare plays in high schools of Ontario. After World War II, in 1946, she help found the New Play Society which was the first professional theatre company in Toronto founded after the war. In 1947, the company presented its first Canadian play, Lister Sinclair's The Man in the Blue Moon. The Society also assisted in creating the Stratford Shakespearean Festival of Canada. As well she helped to bring Tyrone Guthrie, the Tony Award-winning British theatrical director, to Canada.

In 1970, she was made an Officer of the Order of Canada "for her contributions to theatre in Canada". As a recipient of the Order of Canada she received the Canadian version of the Queen Elizabeth II Silver Jubilee Medal in 1977.

Her granddaughters are actresses Charlotte Moore and Tedde Moore, and her great-grandson is actor and music producer Noah "40" Shebib.

Legacy
 Dora Mavor Moore Award

Further reading

References

External links
 Dora Mavor Moore at The Canadian Encyclopedia

1888 births
1979 deaths
Canadian stage actresses
Officers of the Order of Canada
Actresses from Glasgow
Actresses from Toronto
Scottish emigrants to Canada
Havergal College alumni